Stefan Kukoljac (born 7 April 1996) is a Serbian professional footballer who plays as a defender for Serbian club OFK Beograd.

Club career

Voždovac
Born in Dortmund, Kukoljac passed youth categories with Čukarički and also played in Germany for some period of his youth career. In summer 2015, Kukoljac signed with Voždovac, but moved on one-year loan to Crvena zvezda Mali Mokri Lug shortly after. Kukoljac made 23 appearances and scored one goal for the team during the 2015–16 Serbian League Belgrade season, and was elected in the team of Belgrade football association ending of 2015. Kukoljac spent the pre-season training with Voždovac in summer 2016, but later moved on new one-year loan to Sinđelić Beograd.

Later career
In August 2017, Kukoljac signed a one-year contract with Slovenian club Triglav Kranj. He left Triglav during the winter break in early 2018 and returned to Serbia, playing for lower division sides FK BASK and Crvena Zvezda MML. On 14 July 2019, Kukoljac joined OFK Beograd.

Career statistics

Club

References

External links
 

1996 births
Living people
Footballers from Dortmund
Serbian footballers
Serbian expatriate footballers
Association football defenders
FK Voždovac players
FK Sinđelić Beograd players
NK Triglav Kranj players
FK BASK players
OFK Beograd players
Serbian First League players
Slovenian PrvaLiga players
Serbian expatriate sportspeople in Slovenia
Expatriate footballers in Slovenia
German footballers